Kjeld Nielsen (July 26, 1887 – February 14, 1910) was a Danish athlete.  He competed in the 1908 Summer Olympics in London. In the 1500 metres event, Nielsen placed sixth in his initial semifinal heat and did not advance to the final. He also participated in the 5 miles race but was again eliminated in the first round.

References

Sources
 
 
 

1887 births
1910 deaths
Athletes (track and field) at the 1908 Summer Olympics
Olympic athletes of Denmark
Danish male middle-distance runners
Danish male long-distance runners
20th-century Danish people